Juan Manuel Varea (born 23 March 1986 in Buenos Aires) is an Argentine football player who currently plays for Croatian side NK Kamen Ivanbegovina.

Career
Varea started his career with Vélez Sársfield and made his debut in the Argentine Primera División on 12 November 2006, replacing Lucas Castromán in the 72nd minute in a 3–0 win over Gimnasia La Plata. He scored his first goal for the club on 25 November to level the scoreline at 1–1 in an away draw against Nueva Chicago.

In the summer of 2007, Varea joined Deportivo Español in the third division, where he played 11 matches and scored two goals until December 2007. In 2008, Varea signed with Colombian side Depor. He also played for Central Córdoba in Rosario before joined NK Široki Brijeg in summer 2009.

Varea made his debut for Široki Brijeg in a 2–1 away loss against Sturm Graz on 16 July, in the second qualifying round of the 2009–10 Europa League. He made his league debut on 9 August against Željezničar Sarajevo and scored his first goal for the club on 30 August, in a 2–0 home win over Sloboda Tuzla. In January 2010, Varea was awarded the best foreign player in Bosnia and Herzegovina. At the 11th memorial tournament Gojko Šušak 2010 in Široki Brijeg he was awarded the best player of the tournament.

In June 2012, Varea joined Ravan Baku in the Azerbaijan Premier League. On 30 March 2013, he scored his first hat-trick in his career in a 6–2 away win over Turan IK. Varea made 31 appearances during the 2012–13 season finishing as the club's top scorer with 14 goals.

In July 2014, Varea moved back to Bosnia and Herzegovina, joining Željezničar Sarajevo.

On 25 June 2015, Varea signed a one-year contract with Bulgarian side Cherno More Varna, after a successful trial period with the club. He made his debut in a 1–1 home draw against Dinamo Minsk in the second qualifying round of the 2015–16 UEFA Europa League on 16 July. Varea scored his first goal on 11 September, opening a 2–1 home win over Lokomotiv Plovdiv.

In the summer 2019, Varea joined Croatian club NK Kamen Ivanbegovina.

Career statistics

References

External links
 
 Varea at fieldoo.com

1986 births
Living people
Argentine footballers
Argentine expatriate footballers
Association football forwards
Club Atlético Vélez Sarsfield footballers
Deportivo Español footballers
Atlético F.C. footballers
Central Córdoba de Rosario footballers
NK Široki Brijeg players
FK Željezničar Sarajevo players
Ravan Baku FC players
PFC Cherno More Varna players
NK Dugopolje players
KF Bylis Ballsh players
Hibernians F.C. players
NK Imotski players
RNK Split players
Argentine Primera División players
Torneo Federal A players
Primera B Metropolitana players
Premier League of Bosnia and Herzegovina players
Azerbaijan Premier League players
Kategoria Superiore players
First Professional Football League (Bulgaria) players
Maltese Premier League players
First Football League (Croatia) players
Argentine expatriate sportspeople in Colombia
Argentine expatriate sportspeople in Bosnia and Herzegovina
Argentine expatriate sportspeople in Bulgaria
Argentine expatriate sportspeople in Malta
Argentine expatriate sportspeople in Albania
Argentine expatriate sportspeople in Croatia
Expatriate footballers in Colombia
Expatriate footballers in Bosnia and Herzegovina
Expatriate footballers in Bulgaria
Expatriate footballers in Azerbaijan
Expatriate footballers in Malta
Expatriate footballers in Albania
Expatriate footballers in Croatia
Footballers from Buenos Aires
Argentine expatriate sportspeople in Azerbaijan